Parliamentary elections were held in Norway on 10 October 1949. The result was a victory for the Labour Party, which won 85 of the 150 seats in the Storting.

Results

Seat distribution

Notes

References

General elections in Norway
1940s elections in Norway
Norway
Parliamentary
Norway